Sergi García Calvo (born 17 February 1997) is a Spanish professional basketball player for Río Breogán of the Liga ACB.

Career
A product of Centre de Tecnificació Esportiva Illes Balears, García moved to CAI Zaragoza of the Spanish top flight Liga ACB in 2013. Until 2016, he also saw action for Zaragoza’s affiliate El Olivar.

In 2013, García was named Most Valuable Player of the Jordan Brand Classic Camp in Barcelona.

During the 2017–18 ACB season, Valencia Basket paid off García's contract's rescission clause and subsequently signed him under a four-year contract, including the ongoing season. On 24 July 2019 Valencia Basket loaned him to Rasta Vechta for the 2019–20 season. However, on 5 December 2019 he terminated his contract for signing with EuroLeague team Baskonia. Garcia signed with MoraBanc Andorra of the Liga ACB on 20 July 2020.

On 14 December 2021 Garcia signed a two-month contract with Gran Canaria of the Liga ACB. Gran Canaria announced on 18 February 2022 that they do not extent the contract.

On 10 June 2022 he signed with Río Breogán of the Spanish Liga ACB.

National team
He represented the Spanish national under-16 team at the 2012 and 2013 European Championships, winning the gold medal at the second one. In 2014, he helped the under-17 squad to reach the semifinals at the World Championships.

In 2015, García attended to the under-18 European Championships as well as the under-19 World Championships. He was also a member of the under-20 gold-winning squad at the under-20 European Championship.

In November 2017, García was called up with the national team for playing the two first matches of the 2019 World Cup qualifiers. After not playing the first match, he made his debut in Burgos at the win against Slovenia by 92–84.

Notes

External links
Eurobasket.com profile
ACB profile  
FIBA profile

1997 births
Living people
Basket Zaragoza players
BC Andorra players
CB Breogán players
Liga ACB players
Point guards
SC Rasta Vechta players
Spanish men's basketball players
Sportspeople from Palma de Mallorca
Valencia Basket players
Spanish expatriate basketball people in Germany
Spanish expatriate basketball people in Andorra